Vivan or Vivaan may refer to:

Surname
Gianluca Vivan (born 1983), Italian footballer

Given name
Vivan Bhatena (born 1978), Indian model and actor
Vivaan Shah, Indian actor in the Hindi film industry
Vivan Sundaram (born 1943), Indian artist

Fiction
Vivaan Varma, character played by Kunal Kapoor in the 2007 Bollywood film Laaga Chunari Mein Daag

See also
Vivian (disambiguation)

Masculine given names